Portmarnock Golf Club is a links golf club in Portmarnock, County Dublin, Ireland, located close to Dublin Airport.

The golf course is often rated as one of the top courses in the UK and Ireland and is also often included in lists of the top 100 golf courses in the world.

History
On Christmas Eve 1893, an insurance broker named W. C. Pickeman and his friend George Ross rowed over from Sutton to Portmarnock peninsula to explore the possibility of creating a golf links. The peninsula is about two miles long and covers over 500 acres. The course opened on Saint Stephen's Day 1894 with nine holes. It was extended to eighteen holes in 1896 with a new clubhouse and a further nine holes were added in 1971. The championship course follows the original layout although considerably lengthened (over 7,500 yards of the Championship tees). The only major change in the  routing was the insertion in 1927 of a new, now famous par three, the 15th hole.

Portmarnock Golf Club has welcomed some of the greatest players in the world from early greats such as Harry Vardon, Henry Cotton, Bobby Locke, to the first super star of golf, Arnold Palmer. In recent years Pádraig Harrington, Rory McIlroy, Phil Mickelson, David Duval, Paul McGinley and Tiger Woods have all played golf on the course.

Notable events hosted
Portmarnock was the venue for the first Irish Open in 1927, and has hosted the tournament on many occasions since, including 13 following its revival in 1975. Many other important golf tournaments have been held at the club, including the British Amateur Championship in 1949 and 2019, the Walker Cup in 1991, and the Canada Cup in 1960.

Discrimination claims

In 2003 the Equality Authority of Ireland brought a discrimination case in the Dublin District Court under which the club's drinks licence was suspended for 7 days. The finding was overturned in the High Court in 2005, and again in the Supreme Court in 2009, allowing the club to keep its men-only policy.

In 2005, the High Courts decision in the Equal Authority v. Portmarnock Golf Club & Ors became a significant case in Irish gender equality law. While the authority argued such discrimination could not be protected by Section 9 of the ESA because the club providing a space for golf is not necessarily a “need” of men, the Supreme Court believed it was fair to hold Portmarnock Golf Club as a nondiscriminatory club under the Equal Status Act, ruling the fundamental purpose of the club was golf.

Portmarnock Golf Club’s men-only policy was legally enforceable due to its exemption under equal status legislation. The reason for this discrimination against women is because the club has claimed their main purpose is to accommodate the needs of only one gender. Section 9 of the Equal Status Act states that clubs whose main purpose is to serve the needs of only one gender may be considered nondiscriminatory. However, Section 8 of the ESA holds that a club will be considered discriminatory if there is anything, such as a rule or practice that exempts a qualified member or an applicant for membership from being a member of the club. In addition, Section 8 claims a club is considered to be discriminatory if there are different terms and conditions of membership for different individuals. Because Section 8 prohibits gender discrimination, Portmarnock was technically a discriminating club under Section 8 of the ESA.

In May 2021, Portmarnock ended its men-only membership policy.

Honours
 27th best golf course in the UK and Ireland 2021/22 (Golf Monthly)
 62nd best golf course in the world 2022/23 (Golf Digest)
 53rd best golf course in the world 2021–22 (Golf Magazine)

References

External links

https://www.youtube.com/watch?v=3ubPh097hDw

Portmarnock
Golf clubs and courses in the Republic of Ireland
Sports clubs in Fingal
Walker Cup venues
Golf in County Dublin
1894 establishments in Ireland
Irish Open (golf) venues
Sports venues completed in 1894
Sports venues in Fingal